Dips are common to many partner dance styles (Tango, Lindy Hop, Salsa, Ballroom dances). 

Characteristics of a dip include:
 weight-sharing
 dancers' centres go lower than when standing

Some dance styles distinguish between sits, dips, and drops; as a general rule, the difference is the degree to which the base (usually the lead) ends up responsible for the mass and balance of the flyer (usually the follow). Where a distinction is made, it's usually a continuum from least to most responsibility, with sits being the least, drops the most, and dips in between.

There are infinite varieties of dips. Following are some descriptions of some dips; these may also be known by different names in different dance styles, and in different groups within the same dance style.

Standard: The flyer usually balances themself. The flyer's body may be horizontal or vertical. There are many grips for bases. The base uses a one-handed grip if flyer is experienced. In performance, flyer may turn their torso sideways toward the audience or toward the base. In social dance, the flyer usually turns their torso toward the base. The lead can use a two-handed grip for inexperienced partners when social dancing.

Tango: The follow's leg locks around the lead's right leg. The flyer can support themselves, if they have strong core muscles.

Tango Swoop: The flyer leans back (torso horizontal) and moves in a circle and then returns to vertical.

Shoulder Support (Right): When the follow spins to their left, the lead may grip the follows left shoulder with their right arm. The follow will stop spinning when the leads right arm blocks their body. This leads to a natural dip, where the follow simply leans back while the lead supports them by holding their shoulder. Note: Never hold the follows neck.

Shoulder Support (Left): When the follow spins to their left, the lead may grip the follows left shoulder or upper arm, with their left hand. The follow will stop spinning when the leads arm left blocks their body. During the follows spin, the lead's right hand holds the follow's right hand. This leads to a natural dip, where the follow simply leans back, while the lead supports them with both hands: the leads right hand holds the follows right hand behind the leads neck and the leads left hand holds the follows left shoulder.

Lean: The base and flyer stand side by side, with the base's hand on the flyers hip. The base lunges sideways, away from the flyer, holding the flyers hip to theirs. The flyer keeps the inside leg straight and styles with the other, often a figure-4 knee bend.

Lean to Standard: From a lean, the follow rolls forward into a normal dip.

Between the Legs: The lead steps over the follows torso while in a dip.

Straddle: The flyer bends back horizontally. The lead steps over the follows torso, then the lead moves their feet together so the leads feet touch. The flyer is supported by the leads feet.

Death Drop: From cuddle position, with a circus grip. Flyer leans forward and falls as far as the grip allows, which is not very far. Then the lead slips the cuddle arm out and the flyer falls again as far as the grip allows. Spotters should be under where the flyer's head will go until all parties can consistently do this move safely.

One-handed coin swooping dip (Trance): Whilst dipping your partner with the one handed gripping technique, lower your torso until in a vertical position and within reach of the dance floor. There is a slight pelvic sway in sync with the trance beat. With your free hand collect the coin, and then return to the upright position. The position of your leading thigh is key in making this popular move successful

See also 
Lead and follow

Partner dance